The Palm Beach County Convention Center is a multi-purpose facility in West Palm Beach, Florida, managed by Spectra Venue Management. The facility opened in January 2004 and hosts  It is connected via covered walkway to the Hilton West Palm Beach hotel, and is located across the street from CityPlace, an upscale shopping district with nightlife, restaurants and shopping.

See also
List of convention centers in the United States

External links
Official Site

Indoor arenas in Florida
Buildings and structures in West Palm Beach, Florida
Convention centers in Florida
Tourist attractions in Palm Beach County, Florida